The Punjab Provincial Assembly was the legislature of the province of Punjab in British India. Established by British authorities under Government of India Act 1935, the assembly had executive powers and members directly elected from 175 constituencies by first past the post system.

Speakers

Deputy Speakers

Prime Minister

Seats Distribution
All 175 constituencies were reserved on the bases of religion. It was as follows:-

^Special constituencies (non-territory constituency) were further divided into Categories and sub-categories as follow:-
 Women - 4
General - 1
Mohammadans - 2
Sikhs - 1
 European - 1
 Anglo-Indian - 1
 Indian Christian - 2
 Punjab Commerce and Industry - 1
 Landholders - 5
General - 1
Mohammadans - 3
Sikhs - 1
 Trade and Labour Unions - 3
 University - 1

First Assembly

After the passing of Government of India act 1935, Provincial assembly was set up in Punjab. It consisted 175 constituencies. Out of these 159 were single-member constituencies and 8 were double-members constituencies. In double-members constituencies one was reserved for the Schedule Caste according to Poona Pact. In double constituencies each voter had two votes to cast his vote, one for SC candidate and one for general candidate but considered as one vote to calculate voter turnout.

Second Assembly

On the eve of the elections, the political landscape in the Punjab was finely poised, and the Muslim League offered a credible alternative to the Unionist Party. The transformation itself had been rapid, as most landlords and pirs had not switched allegiance until after 1944. The breakdown of talks between the Punjab Premier, Malik Khizar Hayat Tiwana and Muhammad Ali Jinnah in late 1944 had meant many Muslims were now forced to choose between the two parties at the forthcoming election. A further blow for the Unionists came with death of its leading statesman Sir Chhotu Ram in early 1945.

The Result of election was as follows:-

References

History of Punjab
Legislatures of British India